Scutiger wanglangensis is a species of amphibian in the family Megophryidae. It is endemic to China and found in Sichuan and Gansu.

References

wanglangensis
Amphibians described in 2007
Amphibians of China
Endemic fauna of China